Khujeh Galdi (also Romanized as Khūjeh Galdī; also known as Khājehgaldī, Khvājeh Galdī, and Khvojehgaldī) is a village in Maraveh Tappeh Rural District, in the Central District of Maraveh Tappeh County, Golestan Province, Iran. At the 2006 census, its population was 453, in 83 families.

References 

Populated places in Maraveh Tappeh County